Sebastian Dogariu (born 10 September 1977) is a former Romanian weightlifter, and Olympian who competed in the 77 kg category.

Career
He competed at the 2004 Summer Olympics in the 77 kg category, finishing 10th overall.

He was the silver medalist at the 2005 World Weightlifting Championships in the 77 kg division.

Major results

References

Living people
1977 births
Romanian male weightlifters
Olympic weightlifters of Romania
Weightlifters at the 2004 Summer Olympics
World Weightlifting Championships medalists
21st-century Romanian people